Chrysostomos Kalafatis (8 January 1867 – 10 September 1922) known as Saint Chrysostomos of Smyrna, Chrysostomos of Smyrna and Metropolitan Chrysostom, was the Greek Orthodox metropolitan bishop of Smyrna (Izmir) between 1910 and 1914, and again from 1919 until his death in 1922. He was born in  Triglia (today Zeytinbağı), Turkey in 1867, considerably aided the Greek campaign in Smyrna in 1919 and was subsequently killed by a lynch mob after Turkish troops took back the city at the end of the Greco-Turkish War of 1919–1922. He was declared a martyr and a saint of the Eastern Orthodox Church by the Holy Synod of the Church of Greece on 4 November 1992.

Early life 
Kalafatis was born in Triglia (Zeytinbağı) in 1867, one of eight children born to Nikolaos and Kalliopi Lemonidos Kalafatis. He studied at the historical Theological School of Halki from the age of 17, and served as Archdeacon to Konstantinos Valiadis, the then Metropolitan of Mytilene. Kalafatis served as chancellor and in 1902 became the Metropolitan of Drama, a city in northeastern Greece. His vocal nationalism caused the Sublime Porte to request his removal in 1907, and he eventually returned temporarily to Triglia. In 1910 Kalafatis became the Metropolitan of Smyrna.

Smyrna 

Kalafatis had not been in good terms with the Ottoman authorities and he was displaced in 1914. When the Hellenic Army occupied Smyrna in 1919, at the beginning of the Greco-Turkish war, Kalafatis was reinstated to his office as metropolitan bishop. Chrysostomos was on bad terms with High Commissioner Stergiadis (appointed by the Greek Prime Minister Venizelos in 1919) due to the latter's strict stance against discrimination and abuse in dealing with the local Turks, and his opposition to inflammatory nationalist rhetoric used in sermons, which he perceived as too political. US diplomat George Horton described how Stergiadis interrupted an important service at the Orthodox Cathedral in Smyrna:Archbishop Chrysostom (he who was later murdered by the Turks) began to introduce some politics into his sermon, a thing which he was extremely prone to do. Stergiades, who was standing near him, interrupted, saying: "But I told you I didn’t want any of this."Chrysostomos was an ardent supporter of the cause of Greek nationalism, while Stergiadis was seen by some as behaving in a perversely defeatist manner. Chrysostomos wrote to (no longer Prime Minister) Eleftherios Venizelos in 1922, as Turkish troops were approaching, and shortly before the Great Fire of Smyrna, warning that "Hellenism in Asia Minor, the Greek State and the entire Greek Nation are descending now into Hell," and partially blaming him for his appointment of Stergiadis, "an utterly deranged egotist", even though he was an ardent supporter of Venizelos.

Lynching 
After the defeat and retreat of the Hellenic Army in August 1922, Chrysostomos denied the offer to leave the city and decided to stay.

On 10 September (Julian style – 27 August) 1922, soon after the Turkish army had moved into Smyrna, a Turkish officer and two soldiers took Chrysostomos from the office of the cathedral and delivered him to the Turkish commander-in-chief, Nureddin Pasha. The general who is said to have decided to hand him over to a Turkish mob who murdered him. Horton adds that there is no sufficient proof of the veracity of this statement, yet it is certain that he was killed by the mob.  Horton, who was in Smyrna at the time until the evening of 13th of September 1922 just before the Burning of Smyrna, mentions that he did not witness the events and also inaccurately gives the 9th of September as the date of Chrysostomos death.

Fahrettin Altay who witnessed the entry of the Metropolitan and the lynching mentions in his memoirs that religious leaders of the various millets were coming to congratulate the "Gazi". Chrysostomos also came to congratulate with a Greek member of the City council. Münir Kocaçıtak, the legal counsel of the cavalry side army, said; "Do not allow this priest inside without searching him first. He is a well known komitadji, he may wish to make a last sacrifice by bringing a bomb with him." He was searched by the aide-de-camp of Nurettin Paşa and the squad commander of the cavalry side army Nazım from Afyon yet nothing was found. Fahrettin Altay then went upstairs and said to Mustafa Kemal that Chrysostomos came. He jokingly said to Nurettin Paşa the following and sent him outside to meet the metropolitan: "He is your friend! Go see him, I do not want to see him". Fahrettin Altay states that he was in the room where the metropolitan was taken together with Nurettin Paşa. There, Nurettin Paşa said: "Do you see how the justice of Allah has come to be! You are now ashamed of what you have done, right?" Chrysostomos replied: "I am accused. I do not know anything. I am not guilty". Nurettin Paşa then stated to the metropolitan that he is no longer recognized and will not be accepted as the metropolitan and that he should leave and appoint someone in his place. After the reply, Metropolitan with his followers left the building. After he left he was grabbed by his beard by a captain who was in the crowd outside and who witnessed the first day of the invasion. Who harassed the metropolitan by saying: "How can a man of cloth do this. Is it befitting to a man of religion?" he then had the metropolitan scream "Zito Mustafa Kemal". The captain told him that Brigadier General Süleyman Fethi under the threat of bayonets did not say "Zito Venizelos" and had his blood spilled.  

According to French soldiers who witnessed the lynching, but were under strict orders from their commanding officer not to intervene:

"The mob took possession of Metropolitan Chrysostom and carried him away... a little further on, in front of an Italian hairdresser named Ismail ... they stopped and the Metropolitan was slipped into a white hairdresser's overall. They began to beat him with their fists and sticks and to spit on his face. They riddled him with stabs. They tore his beard off, they gouged his eyes out, they cut off his nose and ears."

Bishop Chrysostomos was then dragged (according to some sources, he was dragged around the city by a car or truck) into a backstreet of the Iki Cheshmeli district where he died soon after. Fahrettin Altay states that Mustafa Kemal Paşa was upset and said; "This should not have happened". He adds that the metropolitan's black staff with an ivory, Byzantine Eagle symbolled head, which he had given to the soldier at the door of the building upon his entry, disappeared. He states that it should have been put into a museum.

Family Survivors 
Metropolitan Chrysostomos was survived by his nephews, among whom was Ioannis Elefteriades, who witnessed the arrest and execution of his uncle. He escaped as a refugee to Lebanon, where today his grandson Michel Elefteriades is a well-known Greek-Lebanese artist and producer.

See also 

 Relief Committee for Greeks of Asia Minor
 Halki seminary

Notes

References 

 Akcam, Taner, A Shameful Act: The Armenian Genocide and the Question of Turkish Responsibility. Metropolitan Books. (2006)

External links 
 Chrysostomos (Kalafatis) of Smyrna, at Orthodox Wiki.
 The lost descendants of Hellenism: The Antiochian Greeks, at E-Epanastasi.

1867 births
1922 deaths
People from Tirilye
People from Hüdavendigâr vilayet
20th-century Christian saints
20th-century Eastern Orthodox martyrs
20th-century Eastern Orthodox bishops
Saints of modern Greece
Smyrniote Greeks
Occupation of Smyrna
People murdered in Turkey
Theological School of Halki alumni
People who died in the Greek genocide
Greek torture victims
Christian saints killed by Muslims
Greece–Turkey relations
Lynching deaths
Eastern Orthodox bishops of Smyrna
Greek saints of the Eastern Orthodox Church